Coton may refer to:

Places

United Kingdom
 Coton, Cambridgeshire, a small village and civil parish
 Coton, Northamptonshire, a hamlet
 Coton, Northamptonshire (lost settlement), within the hamlet
 Coton, Shropshire, a village
 Coton, Alveley, Shropshire
 Coton, Staffordshire, a hamlet

Poland
 Cotoń, a village

People
 A. V. Coton (1906–1969), English ballet critic and writer born Edward Haddakin
 Pierre Coton (1564–1626), French Jesuit and confessor to Henry IV and Louis XIII of France
 Tony Coton (born 1961), English football coach and former footballer

See also 
 Coton House, a late 18th-century country house at Churchover, near Rugby, Warwickshire
 Coton Clanford, Staffordshire
 Coton Hill, Shropshire
 Coton Hill, Staffordshire
 Coton in the Elms, Derbyshire
 Coton de Tulear, a Madagascan dog
 Cotton (disambiguation)
 Cotton End (disambiguation)